Irina Spîrlea and Caroline Vis were the defending champions, but Spîrlea did not compete this year. Vis teamed up with Barbara Schett, but withdrew before their semifinal match due to Schett's right toe infection.

Amélie Mauresmo and Chanda Rubin won the title, defeating Ai Sugiyama and Nathalie Tauziat 6–4, 6–4 in the final. This was to be Rubin's 10th and final WTA doubles title.

Seeds

Draw

Draw

Qualifying

Qualifiers

  Anne Kremer /  Henrieta Nagyová

Lucky losers

  Sybille Bammer /  Maja Palaveršić-Coopersmith

Draw

References

External links
 Official results archive (ITF)
 Official results archive (WTA)
 Qualifying draw (ITF)

Generali Ladies Linz - Doubles